Ototropis is a genus of flowering plants in the family Fabaceae, found from Afghanistan, the Indian Subcontinent through to southern China including Taiwan, Southeast Asia, Indonesia and on to New Guinea, and introduced to Japan. There has been some nomenclatural confusion regarding this taxon over the centuries.

Species
Currently, 7 (as of 2022) accepted species that include:

Ototropis amethystina (Dunn) H.Ohashi & K.Ohashi
Ototropis conferta (DC.) H.Ohashi & K.Ohashi
Ototropis hayatae (H.Ohashi) H.Ohashi & K.Ohashi
Ototropis khasiana (Prain) H.Ohashi & K.Ohashi
Ototropis kulhaitensis (C.B.Clarke ex Prain) H.Ohashi & K.Ohashi
Ototropis likabalia (Bennet & Sum.Chandra) H.Ohashi & K.Ohashi
Ototropis multiflora (DC.) H.Ohashi & K.Ohashi

Former species; 
 Ototropis kingiana (Prain) H.Ohashi & K.Ohashi, has been transferred to a new genus as Daprainia kingiana 
 Ototropis elegans (DC.) H.Ohashi & K.Ohashi, a synonym of Sunhangia elegans 
 Ototropis megaphylla (Zoll. & Moritzi) H.Ohashi & K.Ohashi, a synonym of Puhuaea megaphylla 
 Ototropis sequax (Wall.) H.Ohashi & K.Ohashi, a synonym of Puhuaea sequax 
 Ototropis yunnanensis (Franch.) H.Ohashi & K.Ohashi, a synonym of Sunhangia yunnanensis

References

Fabaceae genera
Desmodieae